Danxia is a town in Panzhou, Guizhou, China.

History
On June 4, 2015, Shuitang Town and some parts of Banqiao Town were merged to form a new town named "Danxia".

Administrative division
As of December 2015, the town is divided into 14 villages and 1 community:
 Banqiao Community
 Sanzhai
 Lijiawan
 Meizichong
 Beiyinjing
 Zhaoguantun
 Shunjutun
 Shuitang
 Guoguan
 Huangnitian
 Qiansuo
 Mulong
 Taoyuan
 Huangba
 Waishanlan
 Lishanlan
 Tiechang
 Hetaoshu
 Shadipo
 Cangpukeng
 Pingchuan

Economy
The town's economy is based on nearby coal reserves and agricultural resources. Potatoes are the main crop.

Transportation
The S77 Expressway and Provincial Highway S212 pass across the town north to south.

Attractions
The Huguo Temple is a Buddhist temple in the town.

References

Divisions of Panzhou